Brzostowski Palace is a building in the Vilnius Old Town.

History 
In 1667, the building was purchased by Cyprian Paweł Brzostowski (Lithuanian transliteration: Kiprijonas Povilas Bžostovskis). The palace's current appearance dates back to 1748 when an initial restoration was completed.

In 1772, the palace was purchased by Jokūbas Ignotas Nagurskis.

In 1957 and 1982, the palace was adapted for housing flats. It currently houses a pharmacy and individual flats.

Palaces in Vilnius
Classicism architecture in Lithuania
Houses completed in 1667
1667 establishments in the Polish–Lithuanian Commonwealth